Cycling competitions of the 2019 European Youth Summer Olympic Festival was held around the roads of Baku and Velopark from 23 to 25 July 2019.

Time trials had 10 km for both categories and road races had 75 km for boys, respectively 50 km for girls.

Madis Mihkels from Estonia and Zoë Backstedt won both individual race, time trial and road race.

Medalists

Medal table

Participating nations
A total of 166 athletes from 36 nations competed in cycling at the 2019 European Youth Summer Olympic Festival:

 (2)
 (6)
 (6)
 (6)
 (6)
 (1)
 (1)
 (2)
 (6)
 (6)
 (4)
 (3)
 (6)
 (6)
 (2)
 (4)
 (3)
 (6)
 (4)
 (6)
 (6)
 (6)
 (6)
 (2)
 (6)
 (5)
 (4)
 (5)
 (3)
 (6)
 (5)
 (4)
 (6)
 (6)
 (6)
 (4)

References

External links

2019 European Youth Summer Olympic Festival
2019
2019 European Youth
2019 in cycle racing